Alesis Digital Audio Tape (ADAT) is a magnetic tape format used for the recording of eight digital audio tracks onto the same S-VHS tape used by consumer VCRs.

Although it is a tape-based format, the term ADAT now refers to its successor, the Alesis ADAT HD24, which features hard disk recording rather than the traditional tape-based ADAT, which in turn is now considered obsolete.

History
The product was announced in January 1991 at the NAMM convention in Anaheim, California by Alesis. The first ADAT recorders shipped over a year later in February or March 1992. More audio tracks could be recorded by synchronizing up to 16 ADAT machines together, for a total of 128 tracks. While synchronization had been available in earlier machines, ADAT machines were the first to do so with sample-accurate timing, which in effect allowed a studio owner to purchase a 24-track tape machine eight tracks at a time.  This capability and its comparatively low cost, originally introduced at $3995, were largely responsible for the rise of project studios in the 1990s.

Several versions of the ADAT machine were produced. The original ADAT (also known as Blackface) and the ADAT XT recorded 16 bits per sample (ADAT Type I). A later generation of machines—the XT-20, LX-20 and M-20—supports 20 bits per sample (ADAT Type II). All ADAT machines use the same high-quality S-VHS tape media. Tapes recorded in the older Type I format can be read and written in the more modern machines, but not the other way around. Later generations record at two sample rates, 44.1 and 48 kHz, common in the audio industry. Pitch control is available by varying the sample rate, and thus tape speed accordingly.

With locate points it was possible to store sample-exact positions on tape, making it easy to find specific parts of digital recordings. Using auto play and auto record functions made it possible to punch in/out at predetermined points, rather than relying on human timing ability to start and stop recording at precisely the right instant.

ADAT machines could be controlled externally with the Alesis LRC (Little Remote Control), which could be attached to the ADAT with a 1/4" tip/sleeve plug, and featured the transport controls and most commonly used functions. Alternatively, the BRC (Big Remote Control) could be used, which included many more features which the stand-alone ADAT did not have.

See also
 
 Digital Audio Tape
 Multitrack recording

References

External links
 

Audio storage
Audiovisual introductions in 1992
Digital audio transport